Juanfen is a type of flat rice noodle in China. It is made from ordinary non-glutinous rice.

Pictured left is a bowl of juǎnfěn (卷粉) as served 2015-12-01 in Guangnan, Wenshan, Yunnan, China. In addition to a vegetable broth and the noodles themselves, ingredients include lettuce, thinly cut tomato slices, fried peanuts, spring onion, zhe'ergen (a spicy local rhizome), chilli, powdered white pepper, garlic, soy sauce, powdered Sichuan pepper, and Sichuan pepper oil. The location, external seating on stools around a low table at the roadside, is typical of the region and food.

See also
 List of noodles
 Mixian (noodle)
 Rice, History of domestication and cultivation

References

Chinese noodles
Rice dishes